Steatocystoma simplex is a skin condition characterized by a skin lesion that occurs with equal frequency in adult women and men, and is typically found on the face, trunk, or extremities. It is related to Steatocystoma multiplex.

References 

Epidermal nevi, neoplasms, and cysts